Cinysca alvesi is a species of sea snail, a marine gastropod mollusk in the family Areneidae.

Description

The shell cam grow to be 7 mm in length.

Distribution
Cinysca alvesi can be found off of São Tomé and Principe.

References

Areneidae
Gastropods described in 2002